was a Japanese football player.

National team career
Shinojima was born in Nikko on January 21, 1910. In May 1930, when he was a Tokyo Imperial University student, he was selected Japan national team for 1930 Far Eastern Championship Games in Tokyo and Japan won the championship. At this competition, on May 25, he debuted against Philippines. On May 29, he also played and scored a goal against Republic of China. He played 2 games and scored 1 goal for Japan in 1930.

After retirement
After retirement, Shinojima joined Japan Football Association (JFA). In 1965, he became vice-present of JFA. In 1975, he resigned for health reasons.

On February 11, 1975, Shinojima died of heart failure in Minato, Tokyo at the age of 65. In 2006, he was selected Japan Football Hall of Fame.

National team statistics

References

External links
 
 Japan National Football Team Database
Japan Football Hall of Fame at Japan Football Association

1910 births
1975 deaths
University of Tokyo alumni
Association football people from Tochigi Prefecture
Japanese footballers
Japan international footballers
Association football forwards